Hygroplasta notolatra is a moth in the family Lecithoceridae. It was described by Chun-Sheng Wu in 1998. It is found on Borneo.

References

Moths described in 1998
Hygroplasta